Saly is a name. Notable people with the name include:

 Saly Greige (born 1989), Lebanese beauty pageant titleholder
 Jacques Saly (1717–1776), French-born sculptor
 Julia Saly, Spanish film actress and producer

See also
 Sally (disambiguation)
 Sale (disambiguation)